Ferenc Orosz (born 11 October 1969) is a retired Hungarian footballer. He was a member of the Hungary national football team from 1991 to 1997.

External links

1969 births
Living people
Hungarian footballers
Hungary international footballers
Association football forwards
Footballers from Budapest
Budapest Honvéd FC players
Dorogi FC players
Vác FC players
Budapesti VSC footballers
MTK Budapest FC players
Dunaújváros FC players